Campylobacter lanienae is a species of Campylobacter found in humans and other animals. Like other Campylobacter species, it is rod-shaped, non-glucose-fermenting, oxidase- and catalase-positive, Gram-negative and motile.

References

Further reading

External links

Type strain of Campylobacter lanienae at BacDive -  the Bacterial Diversity Metadatabase

Campylobacterota
Bacteria described in 2000